Tadashi Endo (born 1947) is a butoh dancer resident in Göttingen, Germany.  Endo is a Japanese national. He studied theatre direction in Vienna before touring Europe giving solo performances accompanied by leading jazz performers. In 1980, he was hired as head of a theater program for the city of Northeim, where he worked until 1986. In 1992, he founded the MAMU butoh center in the nearby university city of Göttingen. The center holds performances as well as training students of the dance form and holding an annual festival in the Goettingen Junges Theater. Endo also tours internationally. 
In 2009, he choreographed Georg Friedrich Händel's opera Admeto, directed by Doris Dörrie and performed at the Edinburgh International Festival.

Endo was greatly influenced by Kazuo Ohno, whom he met in 1989. Endo's style is harsh and stark, sometimes accompanied by live or recorded jazz, a dance form that Endo sees as having a natural affinity with butoh.

Literature

Gabriele Endo, Shuichi Sato and Tsuyoshi Takahashi (editors): Tadashi Endo's Dance - the Photobook. . 2009.

References

External links
Interview in México: http://revistafluir.com.mx/index.php?option=com_k2&view=item&id=81:algunos-malentendieron-la-esencia-del-butoh
 Interview in Brazil: http://www.butoh-ma.de/index.php?option=com_content&task=view&id=29&Itemid=7
 http://www.avantart.com/endo/indexd.htm

Japanese male dancers
Contemporary dancers
Butoh
1947 births
Living people